Louis-Léopold Chambard (25 August 1811 – 10 March 1895) was a French sculptor from Jura.

He was born in Saint-Amour dans le Jura and was son of Claude Louis Joseph Marie Chambard, a merchant, After studying at the municipal school of arts in Lyon, he continued at École nationale supérieure des Beaux-Arts in Paris, under supervision of Pierre-Jean David d'Angers and Jean-Auguste-Dominique Ingres and obtained the Prix de Rome in 1837 for his sculpture Marius sur les ruines de Carthage. His success allowed him to be resident from 1838 to 1843 at Villa Medici housing the French Academy in Rome. Chambard had an exposition of his sculptures at the 1841 Salon de Paris. Upon his return from Italy, he had other commissions notably for the Louvre. He died in Neuilly-sur-Seine in 1895.

Main works
 Marius sur les ruines de Carthage, 1837
 Apollon et Coronis, 1842
 La Parure, 1850
 Une suppliante, 1852
 L'Abondance, 1857
 L'Inspiration, 1859
 La Modestie, 1861, east facade of the Cour Carrée in the Palais du Louvre, Paris
 Enfant portant une coquille, 1863
 Mercure, 1866
 La Vengeance, 1868
 Jean-Jacques Cambacérès, 1876-1877 
 Rouget de l'Isle, 1880
 Folette, 1882
 Pompier qui sauve deux enfants d'un incendie, 1885
 Androclès et le lion reconnaissant, 1888
 Le Bûcheron, bronze with brown and golden brown patina

References

1811 births
1895 deaths
People from Jura (department)
Prix de Rome for sculpture
19th-century French sculptors
French male sculptors
19th-century French male artists